Joseph Gabriel Harner (February 19, 1889 – March 5, 1958) was a Boatswain's Mate Second Class (shipboard) Chief Petty Officer in the United States Navy and a Medal of Honor recipient for his role in the United States occupation of Veracruz. An excellent marksman, in the heat of the battle he shot Mexican Navy ex cadet and one of the most revered Mexican national heroes, Lt. José Azueta, from about 300 yards away.

Harner retired from the Navy as chief petty officer and died March 5, 1958.  He buried at Arlington National Cemetery, Arlington, Virginia.

Medal of Honor citation
Rank and organization: Boatswain's Mate Second Class, U.S. Navy. Born: 19 February 1889, Louisville, Ohio. Accredited to: Ohio. G.O. No.: 101, 15 June 1914.

Citation:

On board the U.S.S. Florida, for extraordinary heroism in the line of his profession during the seizure of Vera Cruz, Mexico, 21 April 1914.

See also

 List of Medal of Honor recipients (Veracruz)

Notes

External links

 
 

1889 births
1958 deaths
United States Navy Medal of Honor recipients
United States Navy sailors
People from Louisville, Ohio
Burials at Arlington National Cemetery
United States Navy personnel of World War I
United States Navy personnel of World War II
Battle of Veracruz (1914) recipients of the Medal of Honor
Snipers